Follow That Man may refer to:

 Man Against Crime, also known as Follow That Man, a 1949 American TV series
 Follow That Man (1953 film), a French crime film
 Follow That Man (1961 film), a British comedy film